The Guasaule River is a river in northern Nicaragua and southern Honduras.

See also
Honduras–Nicaragua border

References

Guasaule
Guasaule
International rivers of North America
Honduras–Nicaragua border
Border rivers